The Trinitarians, formally known as the Order of the Most Holy Trinity and of the Captives (abbreviated OSsT), is a mendicant order of the Catholic Church for men founded in Cerfroid, outside Paris, in the late 12th century. From the very outset, a special dedication to the mystery of the Holy Trinity has been a constitutive element of the order's life.

Papal documents refer to the founder only as Brother John, but tradition identifies him as John de Matha, whose feast day is celebrated on 17 December. The founding-intention for the order was the ransom of Christians held captive by Muslims, a consequence of crusading and of piracy along the Mediterranean coast of Europe.

Background
 
Between the eighth and the fifteenth centuries medieval Europe was in a state of intermittent warfare between the Christian kingdoms of southern Europe and the Muslim polities of North Africa, Southern France, Sicily and portions of Spain. According to James W. Brodman, the threat of capture, whether by pirates or coastal raiders, or during one of the region's intermittent wars, was a continuous threat to residents of Catalonia, Languedoc, and the other coastal provinces of medieval Christian Europe.<ref name=brodman>{{cite web | last=Brodman | first=James William | title=Ransoming Captives in Crusader Spain:The Order of Merced on the Christian-Islamic Frontier | website=The Library of Iberian Resources Online | url=http://libro.uca.edu/rc/captives.htm | access-date=2021-10-05}}</ref> Raids by militias, bands, and armies from both sides was an almost annual occurrence.

The redemption of captives is listed among the corporal works of mercy. The period of the Crusades, when so many Christians were in danger of falling into the hands of Muslims, witnessed the rise of religious orders vowed exclusively to this pious work.

History

The Order of the Trinitarians (Order of the Holy Trinity and Captives) was founded by St. John de Matha after his vision of Christ with two captives around 1193.The Order of the Holy Trinity and Captives: Andrew Witko 2008 Pope Innocent III granted the order and its rule approval with his letter Operante divine dispositionis clementia, issued on 17 December 1198. Soon after papal approbation, the Trinitarian ministry to Christian captives was incorporated into the Order's title: Order of the Holy Trinity and of Captives. In addition to the Order's purpose of ransoming Christian captives, each local community of Trinitarians served the people of its area. And so, their ministry included hospitality, care of the sick and poor, churches, education, etc. Eventually, the Trinitarians also assumed the work of evangelization.

Brother John's founding intention expanded quickly beyond the three initial foundations (Cerfroid, Planels, Bourg-la-Reine) into a considerable network of houses committed to the ransom of Christian captives and the works of mercy conducted in their locales. Trinitarian tradition considers St. Felix of Valois co-founder of the Order and companion of John of Matha at Cerfroid, near Paris. In Cerfroid the first Trinitarian community was established and it is considered the mother house of the whole Order. Among the earliest recruits were some Englishmen, and the first to go on the special mission of the order were two English friars, who in 1200 went to Morocco and returned to France with 186 liberated Christian captives.

The first generation of Trinitarians could count some fifty foundations. In northern France, the Trinitarians were known as "Mathurins" because they were based in the church of Saint-Mathurin in Paris from 1228 onwards. Ransoming captives required economic resources. Fundraising and economic expertise constituted important aspects of the Order's life. The Rule's requirement of "the tertia pars", or setting aside  one-third of all income for the ransom of Christian captives, became a noted characteristic of the Order.

Louis IX installed a house of their order in his château of Fontainebleau. He chose Trinitarians as his chaplains, and was accompanied by them on his crusades. The Master of the Trinity was taken captive together with Louis IX after the Battle of Al Mansurah.

The rule initially was the Augustinian, supplemented by regulations of an austere character. The habit was white, with the red and blue cross depicted above on the breast. Through the centuries, the Trinitarian Rule underwent several revisions, notably in 1267 and in 1631. It has been complemented by statutes and constitutions. The thirteenth century was a time of vitality, whereas the following centuries brought periods of difficulty and even decline in some areas. The Council of Trent (1545–1563) was a major turning-point in the life of the Catholic Church. Its twenty-fifth session dealt with regulars and nuns and the reform of religious orders. Reforming interests and energies manifested themselves among Trinitarians in France with the foundation at Pontoise, north of Paris, during the last quarter of the sixteenth century. Reform-minded Trinitarians in Spain first established the movement known as the Recollection and then, under the leadership of St. John Baptist of the Conception, a movement at Valdepeñas (Ciudad Real) known as the Spanish Discalced Trinitarians at the very end of the sixteenth century. Far-reaching periods of growth and development followed this rebirth, and at the beginning of the 18th century there were still 250 houses.

In succeeding centuries, European events such as revolution, government suppression and civil war had very serious consequences for the Trinitarian Order and it declined significantly. During the last decades of the nineteenth century, the Trinitarians began to grow slowly in Italy and Spain. Its members dedicated themselves to fostering and promoting devotion to the Holy Trinity, evangelising non-Christians, assisting immigrants, educating the young, and to parish work.

The Trinitarian Family

Today the Trinitarian family is composed of priests, brothers, women (cloistered nuns and active sisters) as well as committed laity. Members of the Trinitarian family include the Trinitarian religious; the Trinitarian contemplative nuns; the Trinitarian Sisters of Valence; the Trinitarian Sisters of Rome, Valencia, Madrid, Mallorca, and Seville; the Oblates of the Most Holy Trinity; the Third Order Secular (tertiaries) and other Trinitarian laity. All are distinguished by the cross of red and blue which dates from the origins of the Order. Trinitarians are found throughout Europe and in the Americas as well as in Africa, India, Korea and the Philippines.

In 2000 the Vatican Congregation for Institutes of Consecrated Life and Societies of Apostolic Life approved "The Trinitarian Way" rule of life which would guide all the lay groups associated with the Trinitarians: the Third Order Secular, the Trinitarian Movement, Confraternities, etc.

Charism
The Glory of the Most Holy Trinity and the ransom of Christian Captives. Along with the Order's mission of ransoming Christian captives, each Trinitarian Community served the people of its area by performing works of mercy; redemption and mercy are at the center of the Trinitarian charism.

Our Lady of Good Remedy
Our Lady of Good Remedy is the patroness of the Order of the Most Holy Trinity. Devotion to Mary under this ancient title is widely known in Europe and Latin America. Her feast day is celebrated on 8 October.

Scapular of the Most Blessed Trinity

The Scapular of the Holy Trinity is a devotional scapular associated with the Confraternity of The Holy Trinity and the Third Order Secular of the Most Holy Trinity. It is a white scapular with a cross of which the transverse shaft is blue and the longitudinal shaft red. It is worn by Tertiaries as well as members of the Confraternity of the Blessed Trinity (or other Trinitarian associations that make use of the scapular) after investment with this scapular. It is a sign of consecration to the Holy Trinity and of fraternity.

 See also 
 Angelo Buccarello
 DeMatha Catholic High School, the only college preparatory and secondary educational school in the Americas run by the Trinitarian Order.
 Order of the Blessed Virgin Mary of Mercy
 San Tommaso in Formis, the Trinitarian church in Rome
 San Carlo alle Quattro Fontane in Rome

 References 

Sources
 
 Witko, Andrew. The Order of the Holy Trinity and Captives'', 2008

External links 

 Letter Of Pope John Paul II To The Minister General Of The Order Of The Most Holy Trinity
 Trintarian Official site
 Trinitarian Order
 Adare Trinitarian church

 
Mendicant orders
Christian religious orders established in the 12th century
Catholic devotions
Scapulars